Kızılcabölük can refer to:

 Kızılcabölük, Koçarlı
 Kızılcabölük, Tavas